The 2010 Ordos Superleague Formula round was a Superleague Formula round  held on October 3, 2010, at the newly built Ordos International Circuit, Ordos City, China. It was Superleague Formula's first visit to China, and is followed the week after by a round through the streets of Beijing. It was the tenth round of the 2010 Superleague Formula season.

Eighteen clubs took part including Chinese club Beijing Guoan. A nineteenth car, one of a Team China also took part for the first time in the series. This meant the largest ever grid for a race weekend in Superleague Formula.

Support races for the event were from the Polo Star Cup.

Report

Qualifying

Race 1

Race 2

Super Final

Results

Qualifying
 In each group, the top four qualify for the quarter-finals.

Group A
BEI - John Martin
TOT - Craig Dolby
ACM - Yelmer Buurman
ASR - Julien Jousse
LFC - Frédéric Vervisch
FCP - Earl Bamber
COR - Robert Doornbos
ATM - Bruno Méndez
LYO - Tristan Gommendy

Group B
CHI - Ma Qing Hua
AND - Davide Rigon
FCB - Max Wissel
OLY - Ben Hanley
FLA - Andy Soucek
GAL - Giacomo Ricci
SCP - Adrián Vallés
SEV - Marcos Martínez
GDB - Franck Perera
PSV - Adderly Fong

Knockout stages

Grid

Race 1

Race 2

Super Final

Standings after the round

References

External links
 Official results from the Superleague Formula website

Ordos
Superleague Formula Ordos